Diogo Ferraz Branquinho (born 25 July 1994) is a Portuguese handballer for FC Porto and the Portuguese national team.

He represented Portugal at the 2020 European Men's Handball Championship.

Honours
ABC Braga
Portuguese League: 2015–16
Portuguese Cup: 2014–15, 2016–17
Portuguese Super Cup: 2015
EHF Challenge Cup: 2015–16

Porto
Portuguese League: 2018–19, 2020–21
Portuguese Cup: 2018–19, 2020–21
Portuguese Super Cup: 2019, 2021

References

External links

Portuguese male handball players
1994 births
People from Aveiro, Portugal
Living people
FC Porto handball players
Handball players at the 2020 Summer Olympics
Sportspeople from Aveiro District